The Anglican Diocese of Bida is one of 11 within the Anglican Province of Lokoja, itself one of 14 provinces within the Church of Nigeria. The current bishop is Jonah Kolo

Notes

Dioceses of the Province of Lokoja
 
Bida